Nesøya is a small island in the municipality of Asker, Norway. It is linked to the mainland via a bridge.

The island is known for having a number of celebrities and members of the Norwegian financial elite among its residents.

Much of the eastern part of the island is a nature reserve.

The island most likely got its name from the farm Nes on the mainland. This farm is assumed to have been one of the oldest ones in the district.

References

External links
Nesøya grade/primary school

http://www.nesoya-eldres-vel.net/22686557 (in Norwegian)

Islands of Viken (county)
Asker